Ovidiu Island is a small island located in Siutghiol Lake, west of the Black Sea. The island is part of Constanța County, Dobruja, Romania.

History
The island is of limestone composition. Here, the poet Publius Ovidius Naso (who lived between 43 AD and 17 AD) was exiled by Emperor Augustus in 8 AD. During his exile, he wrote two works. According to the research done on the island, there are traces of human settlements from the times of the Dacians, and the oldest settlements date from the Paleolithic. Over the years, settlements of the Getae, Scythians, and Greeks have been found here.

References 

Islands of Romania
Ovidiu